is a 1980 violent pink film in Nikkatsu's Roman Porno series. It was director Naosuke Kurosawa's debut work.

Synopsis
A woman living in an expensive Tokyo apartment suspects that the piano tuner living on the same floor is the man who raped her years before. When she witnesses the man raping another woman, she becomes convinced of his identity, but is unwilling to report him to the police because of a mysterious attraction she has towards him.

Cast
 Erina Miyai as Saeko
 Yōko Azusa as Sachi
 Yūko Ōsaki as Mayuko
 Miki Yamaji as High school girl
 Beniko Iida as Young housewife
 Keijirō Shiga as Takaya Nakabayashi
 Toshikatsu Matsukaze as Kōichi
 Ren Seidō as Keigo
 Rei Takagi as Glamorous woman
 Yūko Araragi as Woman in the gym
 Yūko Katagiri as Opera singer
 Hidetoshi Kageyama
 Setsu Midorikawa
 Yōko Ōyagi
 Midori Mori

Background
Zoom In: Rape Apartments was an unofficial sequel to director Kōyū Ohara's Zoom Up: Rape Site (1979), inspired by the success of that film and written by that film's screenwriter Chiho Katsurako. For Zoom In: Rape Apartments, Nikkatsu intentionally cut back on the extreme violence displayed in Ohara's earlier film. The surrealistic elements of the film, such as a scene in which liquid dripping from a woman's vagina bursts into flame upon hitting the ground, has led some to compare Kurosawa's style to that of Seijun Suzuki.

The film inspired a series of films using the Zoom In/Zoom Up title, including Zoom Up: Woman From The Dirty Magazine (1980), Zoom Up: Sexual Crime Report (1981), Zoom Up: Genuine Look At A Stripper (1982), Zoom Up: Graduation Photos (1984), and Zoom Up: Special Masturbation (1986).

Critical appraisal
Japanese critics praised director Naosuke Kurosawa's use of imagery in Zoom In: Rape Apartments and the film's cinematography. They were not as impressed with the script, however, complaining that it was weak. In their Japanese Cinema Encyclopedia: The Sex Films, Thomas and Yuko Mihara Weisser give the film a rating of two-and-a-half out of four stars. They judge that the film's strong visual sense compensates for the writing, noting that pink film scripts are not generally the best. They write, "Kurosawa's 'color-and-shadow' work is akin to that of an erotic Seijun Suzuki." Allmovie warns that the film's subject matter is not for all audiences, but judges it to be "one of the Nikkatsu studio's most unusual pinku eiga films."

Availability
Zoom In: Rape Apartments was released theatrically in Japan on March 15, 1980. It was released on DVD in Japan on March 24, 2006 as part of Geneon's third wave of Nikkatsu Roman porno series.

References

Bibliography

English

Japanese
 
 
 
 

1980 films
1980s exploitation films
Japanese horror films
Nikkatsu films
Nikkatsu Roman Porno
Erotic horror films
1980 horror films
1980 thriller films
Films about rape
Films set in apartment buildings
1980s Japanese films